Goli Nuiyeh (also Romanized as Golī Nū’īyeh and Golī Now’īyeh; also known as Golūnū’īyeh) is a village in Siyah Banuiyeh Rural District, in the Central District of Rabor County, Kerman Province, Iran. At the 2006 census, its population was 265, in 63 families.

References 

Populated places in Rabor County